Ernest Harvey may refer to:

Ernest Harvey of the Harvey baronets
Ernest Harvey (cricketer) (1880–1923), Australian cricketer
Ernest Musgrave Harvey, Chief Cashier
Ernest Harvey (footballer), English footballer